Oceano is an American deathcore band from Cook County, Illinois. Formed in 2006, the band signed to Earache Records and released their debut album, Depths on April 7, 2009. Their second album, Contagion was released on November 9, 2010. Their fourth album Ascendants was released March 23, 2015. Their most recent album  Revelation  was released on May 19, 2017. It was their first release with their new label, Sumerian Records.

Following the departure of lead guitarist Jeremy Carroll in 2009, the band no longer had any of its original members. Vocalist Adam Warren was the longest tenured member of the band, having been with Oceano since joining in 2007.

History 
Upon its formation in 2006, Oceano was originally a four-piece band formed by Jeremy Carroll, which consisted of Carroll on lead guitar, Jeff Erickson on bass, Nico LaCorcia on drums and Eddie Harris on vocals. Oceano went through a revolving cast of players until settling on a new lineup and a new sound in 2007.  That lineup, consisting of Adam Warren on vocals, Andrew Mikhail on rhythm guitar, Michael Southcomb on drums and Kevin Hare on bass, went on to develop the sound they took to the world in their first recordings.

Oceano recorded their full debut album Depths in late 2008, releasing it worldwide on April 20, 2009.

Jeremy Carroll was fired from the band in January 2009 due to personality conflicts between members. Carrol's leaving left no original members from the original Oceano lineup in the band. On February 3, 2010, Andrew Mikhail also departed from the band.

Oceano was a part of the 2011 Summer Slaughter Tour in North America alongside co-headliners Whitechapel and The Black Dahlia Murder.

In January 2012, a rumor spread that the band was disestablishing, which was confirmed as false by Earache. Instead, an announcement was made that the band actually was going on a short hiatus after their performance at the New England Metal and Hardcore Festival due to vocalist, Adam Warren, becoming a father. After some time spent away from the band, however, Oceano decided not to disband, and to continue touring. Prior to performing as a part of the roster for the US summer Scream It Like You Mean it tour they revealed that they had begun writing their next album, Incisions, due in 2013. The first lyric video from the album, "Slow Murder", was released on January 28, 2013. On January 12, 2015, the band released a new song titled "Dead Planet" from their fourth album Ascendants which was released on March 23 from Earache Records. On February 17, 2017, the band announced via Facebook that they had signed over to Sumerian Records. They released their fifth album, Revelation, on May 19.

On August 17th, 2022, Oceano released Mass Produced, their first new song since 2017.

Musical style and lyrics 
Oceano is a deathcore band, a mixture of the genres metalcore, hardcore, and death metal. They also (particularly in their earliest material) had a slight influence from grindcore. Blast beats, sonic double bass, slow heavy breakdowns and low death metal growls and occasionally the shrieked vocals typical in metalcore are present. The lyrics range from anti-religion to misanthropy. The band has been inspired by acts like Dying Fetus, Cannibal Corpse, Decapitated, Behemoth, The Acacia Strain, Deicide, Hatebreed, Suicide Silence, Meshuggah, and Slayer.

Members 

Current lineup
Adam Warren – vocals (2007–present)
Scott Smith – guitars (2014–present)
Chris Wagner – bass (2014–present)

Former members
Eddie "Doom" Harris – vocals (2006–2007)
Jeff Erickson – bass (2006–2007)
Derek Hildreth – drums (2006–2007)
Nico LaCorcia – drums (2007)
Kevin Hare – bass (2007–2008)
Michael Southcomb – drums (2007–2008)
Jeremy Carroll – lead guitar (2006–2009)
Tristan McCann – lead guitar (2009)
Andrew Mikhail – rhythm guitar (2007–2010)
Devin Shidaker – lead guitar (2010–2013) 
Daniel Terchin – drums (2008–2013)
Nick Conser – rhythm guitar (2010–2014)
Jason Jones – bass (2008–2014)
Chason Westmoreland – drums (2014–2015)
Mike Shanahan – third guitar (2014–2015)
Michael Kasper – lead guitar (2013–2016)
Andrew Holzbaur – drums (2015–2017)
Matt Kohanowski – drums (2017–2022)

Timeline

Discography 

Demos
 Demo 2006 
 Demo 2007
 Demo 2008

References

External links 

Early footage of Oceano playing live (2007) on YouTube

Heavy metal musical groups from Illinois
American deathcore musical groups
American grindcore musical groups
Musical quartets
Earache Records artists
Musical groups from Chicago
Musical groups established in 2006